Caopatina Lake is a freshwater body of the southeastern portion of Eeyou Istchee James Bay (Municipality), in Jamésie, in the administrative region of Nord-du-Québec, in the province of Quebec, in Canada.

Forestry is the main economic activity of the sector. Recreational tourism activities come second.

The hydrographic slope of Lake Caopatina is accessible through the forest road R1032 (North-South direction). The surface of Caopatina Lake is usually frozen from early November to mid-May, however, safe ice circulation is generally from mid-November to mid-April.

Geography

Toponymy
Of Innu origin or Cree, this hydronym would mean "lake between two cliffs". The name "Lac Caopatina" has been indicated on various cartographic documents since at least 1927. In the past, this body of water was designated in various toponymic forms: Kaopatina, Kaopatnaginsckao and Lac de l'Épinette Rouge.

The toponym "Lac Caopatina" was formalized on December 5, 1968, by the Commission de toponymie du Québec, when it was created.

Notes and references

See also 

Eeyou Istchee James Bay
Lakes of Nord-du-Québec
Nottaway River drainage basin